Acacia spinosissima is a shrub of the genus Acacia and the subgenus Phyllodineae native to south western Australia.

Description
It has striate and ribbed branches that are covered in a fine, white powdery coating with many short and spreading branchlets that are a quite spiny and often without phyllodes. Like most species it has phyllodes rather than true leaves. The ascending to erect phyllodes have a narrowly oblong shape and are usually straight or shallowly sigmoid. It blooms from August to September and produces yellow flowers. The rudimentary inflorescences occur singly on racemes with an axis length of less than and have sperical flower-heads with a diameter of  containing 7 to 23 bright lemon yellow coloured flowers.

Distribution
It is native to an area in the Wheatbelt region of Western Australia where it is commonly situated on undulating plains growing in gravelly sandy soils often over or around laterite or loamy to clay soils. Its range extends from around Cadoux in the north to around Brookton in the south and as far east to around Lake King.

See also
List of Acacia species

References

spinosissima
Acacias of Western Australia
Taxa named by George Bentham
Plants described in 1855